The 2017 Judo Grand Prix Zagreb was held at the Dom Sportova in Zagreb, Croatia, from 29 September to 1 October 2017.

Medal summary

Men's events

Women's events

Source Results

Medal table

References

External links
 

2017 IJF World Tour
2017 Judo Grand Prix
Grand Prix 2017
Judo
2017 in Croatian sport
Judo
Judo
Judo